FC Dinamo-93 Minsk (Dynama-93 Minsk) was a Belarusian football club based in Minsk. They disbanded in 1998.

History
Dinamo-2 Minsk was founded in 1992 as a reserve team for Dinamo Minsk, replacing Dinamo-d Minsk, which competed in Soviet Reserves Top League before the dissolution of USSR. Dinamo-2 spent 1992 season in Belarusian First League and won the tournament. In order to get promoted, Dinamo-2 separated from its parent and became independent team. They were renamed to FC Belarus Minsk for the 1992–93 season, and finally to FC Dinamo-93 Minsk in 1993.

The team was quite successful: they finished second once (1993–94), and third three times (1992–93, 1994–95 and 1995). They also won Belarusian Cup in 1995 and reached the final again 1997. Due to these results Dinamo-93 were able to play in European Cups (Cup Winners' Cup in 1995–96, UEFA Cup in 1996–97 and Intertoto Cup in 1997).

In 1998, after the first half of the season, Dinamo-93 withdrew from the competition due to lack of finances and disbanded.

Name changes
1992 (spring): founded as FC Dinamo-2 Minsk
1992 (summer): renamed to FC Belarus Minsk
1993: renamed to FC Dinamo-93 Minsk
1998: disbanded

Honours
 Belarusian Premier League
 Runners-up (1): 1993–94
 3rd place (3): 1992–93, 1994–95, 1995
 Belarusian Cup
 Winners (1): 1995
 Runners-up (1): 1997
 Commonwealth of Independent States Cup
 Runners-up (1): 1993

League and Cup history

1 Including the play-off game (3–0 win) for the first place against Shinnik Bobruisk, who had the same number of points at the end of the season.

Dinamo-93 in Europe

References

External links
Profile at footballfacts.ru

 
Belarusian reserve team football
Defunct football clubs in Belarus
FC Dinamo Minsk
Association football clubs established in 1992
Association football clubs disestablished in 1998
Football clubs in Minsk
1992 establishments in Belarus
1998 disestablishments in Belarus